Thomas Baxter Preston (3 October 1932 – 16 April 2015) was a Scottish footballer who played for Hibernian and St Mirren. Preston appeared for Hibernian in the 1958 Scottish Cup Final and made over 300 appearances for the club in all competitions. He also scored a goal in a famous victory for Hibs against FC Barcelona.

Preston died in April 2015, aged 82.

References

1932 births
2015 deaths
Scottish footballers
Association football inside forwards
Hibernian F.C. players
St Mirren F.C. players
Scottish Football League players
Footballers from Edinburgh
Newtongrange Star F.C. players
Scottish Junior Football Association players